Ralph Charlton Palmer (1839 – 8 September 1923) was an English barrister who was Clerk of the Crown in Chancery from 1880 to 1885.

References 
 https://www.ukwhoswho.com/view/10.1093/ww/9780199540891.001.0001/ww-9780199540884-e-201327

English barristers
1839 births
1923 deaths
Date of birth missing
Place of birth missing
Place of death missing